Byron Bonilla Martínez (born 30 August 1993) is a Nicaraguan professional footballer who plays as a forward for Liga FPD club Cartaginés and the Nicaragua national team.

Club career

Early career 
Byron Bonilla was born in Granada, Nicaragua, but he moved to Costa Rica along with his mother at the age of nine. During his childhood, Bonilla did not have a football education, and he felt interested in practicing it when he turned sixteen.

Byron played for Costa Rican LINAFA clubs like San Pablo, San Rafael, and JK Sporting. He spelled a two-month period with Saprissa de Corazón of the Second Division, however he had to leave the team because of permanency issues in the country.

Sporting San José 
In mid 2016, Bonilla was acquired by the Second Division team Sporting San José ahead of their inaugural season in the league. He made his official debut on 1 October in the 0−5 victory over Coto Brus. He finished his first season with eight goals.

At the 2017—18 season, he became one of the leaders for the team and was awarded as the best foreign player.

Municipal Grecia 
On 11 January 2019, signed a six-month loan deal with First Division club Municipal Grecia.

Deportivo Saprissa 
On 22 May 2019, Deportivo Saprissa announced that Bonilla joined the club on a two-year contract, on loan from Sporting San José.

International career 
On 8 December 2016, Bonilla received his first call-up to the Nicaragua national team managed by Henry Duarte. He debuted on 30 December in a match against Trinidad and Tobago, as a substitution for Daniel Cadena at the beginning of the second half.

On 4 June 2019, Bonilla was named to Nicaragua's final 23-man for the 2019 CONCACAF Gold Cup.

International goals
Scores and results list Nicaragua's goal tally first.

Honours 
Individual
 Best foreign player of the Costa Rican Second Division: 2017–18
 Best XI of the Costa Rican Second Division: 2017–18
 Included on the team of the week of the Costa Rican Second Division: 2017 Apertura, weeks 4, 5, 6, 11, 18, quarter–finals second leg, semi–finals second leg.
 Most valuable player of the week: 2017 Apertura, week 4.
 Included on the team of the week of the Costa Rican Second Division: 2018 Clausura, weeks 9, quarter–finals second leg, semi–finals first and second leg.

References

External links 
 Byron Bonilla at Soccerway
 Byron Bonilla at National Football teams

1993 births
Living people
Nicaraguan men's footballers
People from Granada, Nicaragua
Association football forwards
Association football wingers
Association football midfielders
Nicaragua international footballers
Liga FPD players
Municipal Grecia players
Deportivo Saprissa players
Nicaraguan expatriate footballers
Nicaraguan expatriate sportspeople in Costa Rica
Expatriate footballers in Costa Rica
2019 CONCACAF Gold Cup players